Samuel Rubel (1881-1949) was an American millionaire immigrant from Russia.

Life and career 
In the 1920 U. S. Census his occupation was described as "Coal Miner & Ice Retailer." Rubel emigrated to America in 1904 from Riga, Latvia, at the age of 23. Rubel started his career selling coal and ice with a horse-drawn wagon in the tenements in the East New York section of Brooklyn.

Rubel became the head of the Pocono Mountain Ice Company based in Hoboken, New Jersey, which became the leading ice company in the Pennsylvania and New Jersey area, buying up many of the smaller ice companies. Beginning in the 1930s with the advent of refrigeration, the harvesting of the ice from lakes became less and less profitable. Eventually, the ice companies folded, and Rubel switched his focus to other fields (such as brewing).

In 1946, Rubel's mansion in Roslyn, New York was destroyed by fire.

Rubel died on April 29, 1949. He was president of the Ebling Brewing Company at the time of his death and his net worth was estimated at $8,000,000.

Rubel was a supporter of the Boy Scouts of America. Samuel Rubel donated a large tract of land around Stillwater Lake in Pocono Summit, PA to the Bethlehem Area Council; the land was presented to the Scouts on May 27, 1949. The land, which is now known as Camp Minsi, is still in use by the Boy Scouts today.

Personal life 
Samuel Rubel married Dora Nachumowitz; the couple had two daughters.

Death

Obituary from the New York Times (April 30, 1949):

References

Ice trade
American brewers
Emigrants from the Russian Empire to the United States
1881 births
1949 deaths
20th-century American philanthropists